Anne McCahon (née Hamblett – 11October 191530December 1993) was a New Zealand artist who emerged as part of a lively South Island art scene in the 1930s, often taking trips into the countryside on painting excursions with fellow artists Doris Lusk, Toss and Edith Woollaston, and her eventual husband, Colin McCahon. Hamblett studied and first exhibited in Dunedin in the 1930s and '40s. Her artistic output was circumscribed after she married fellow modernist artist Colin McCahon in 1942.  Her work has rarely been exhibited since her early Dunedin painting days (circa 1934–1944) and her first solo show took place posthumously in 2016 at Te Uru Waitakere Contemporary Gallery.

Married life
Hamblett married Colin McCahon (1919–1987) in 1942 at St. Matthew's Church, Dunedin. As McCahon relied on seasonal work for income, Hamblett returned to live with her parents. Over the next five years, their time together was intermittent. The couple had four children — two daughters and two sons: William, Catherine, Victoria, and Matthew. Hamblett was a significant presence in what is now known as McCahon House, where the family lived from 1953–59, managing the household, hosting guests, and supplementing the family income through illustration work.

Family house museum and artists' residency
The McCahon family house near French Bay, Titirangi, Auckland, now serves as a small museum about the McCahon family. The house is surrounded by large kauri trees.  A more contemporary house and studio in the same section serves as the base for the McCahon House artists' residency. The contemporary house hosts three artists for three months every year.

References

1915 births
1993 deaths
Modern painters
People from Mosgiel
20th-century New Zealand painters
New Zealand artists